Jorgovanka Tabaković (born 21 March 1960) is a Serbian politician who has been the governor of the National Bank of Serbia since 2012. A member of the Serbian Progressive Party (SNS), she has been the deputy president of the party since 2012.

Biography 
Tabaković holds a bachelor's and master's degree in economics from the University of Priština and a Ph.D. in economics obtained in 2011 from the private Faculty of Service Business. In 1992, she joined the Serbian Radical Party and represented the party in the Parliament as a member. After the 1997 elections, the radicals joined a new Serbian government in 1998, with the Socialist Party of Serbia and JUL. That same year, she became Minister of Ownership and Economic Transformation.

In May 2008, in early parliamentary elections, she was re-elected as a member of Parliament. In September 2008, after the split of the party, she joined the Serbian Progressive Party led by Tomislav Nikolić, and became a member of the parliamentary group "Let's Get Serbia Moving."

Following the resignation of previous Governor Šoškić over a disagreement with adopted amendments to the National Bank of Serbia Law, President of Serbia Tomislav Nikolić proposed and nominated Tabaković to the post, and she was elected as the Governor of the National Bank of Serbia on 6 August 2012. She lives in Novi Sad, having resided in Priština until 1999.

References

External links 

Jorgovanka Tabaković profile, samo-opusteno.info; accessed 9 February 2016.

1960 births
Living people
University of Novi Sad alumni
University of Pristina alumni
Serbian Progressive Party politicians
Governors of the National Bank of Serbia
Serbian economists
Kosovo Serbs
Politicians from Vushtrri
21st-century Serbian women politicians
21st-century Serbian politicians
Serbian Radical Party politicians